There are several schools of the same name:
 St. Columba's College, Dublin, a co-educational boarding school affiliated with the Church of Ireland in Dublin, Ireland
 St. Columba's College, Melbourne, an all-female Catholic secondary school in Melbourne, Australia
 St Columba's College, St Albans, a Catholic independent boys' school in St Albans, England
 St. Columba's College, Hazaribagh, India
 St. Columba's College, Largs, former boys Catholic independent preparatory college in Largs, Scotland 
 St Columba College, Andrews Farm, Adelaide, South Australia

See also
St. Columba's School (disambiguation)